

Dubbed films

References 

 2002
2002
Malayalam
Malayalam films